Piazza San Fedele (Saint Fedele Square in English) is sited in Milan near Palazzo Marino (Milan's Municipal office), the Vittorio Emanuele II Gallery and Piazza della Scala in a pedestrian area in the centre of the city. 

In the centre of square there is a bronze statue honoring the writer Alessandro Manzoni. The writer was born in the nearby Casa Manzoni in Belgiojoso square on 7 March 1785. On 6 January 1873, while exiting mass at the church of San Fedele, he fell on the steps. The head wound led to his demise on 22 May 1873. The statue was sculpted by Francesco Barzaghi and erected in 1883.

Bibliography
Milano e Provincia, Touring Club Italiano, ed.2003, Autori Vari. Italian

San Fedele
Odonyms referring to religion